Al-Nu'man I ibn Imru' al-Qays, surnamed al-A'war ("the one-eyed") and al-Sa'ih ("the wanderer/ascetic"), was the king of the Lakhmid Arabs (reigned ca. 390–418).

Nu'man was the son of Imru' al-Qays II ibn 'Amr and followed his father on the throne. He is best known for his construction of two magnificent palaces, the Khawarnaq and Sadir, near his capital al-Hirah, which were accounted by contemporary Arab lore among the wonders of the world. The Khawarnaq was built as a resort for his overlord, the Sasanian Persian shah Yazdegerd I (r. 399–420) and his son Bahram V (r. 420–438), who spent his childhood years there.

According to later Arab tradition, he renounced his throne and became an ascetic, after a reign of 29 years. He is also reputed to have visited the Christian hermit Symeon the Stylite between 413 and 420. He was succeeded by his son al-Mundhir I (r. 418–452), who played an important role by assisting Bahram V in claiming his throne after Yazdegerd's death and by his actions in the Roman–Sasanian War of 421–422.

See also
Sinnimar, architect for the palace Khawarnaq

References

Sources
 
 
 

5th-century monarchs in the Middle East
418 deaths
Lakhmid kings
Year of birth unknown
4th-century Arabs
5th-century Arabs
Vassal rulers of the Sasanian Empire
Arabs from the Sasanian Empire
Arab Christians in Mesopotamia